A. heathi may refer to:

 Amaurobius heathi, a spider species found in the United States of America
 Amphisbaena heathi, a worm lizard species found in Brazil

See also
 Heathi (disambiguation)